Anne Goulding (born 1966) is a New Zealand library academic, specialising in the management of public libraries. She did her PhD at the University of Sheffield and is now Professor of Library and Information Management at Victoria University of Wellington.

Goulding is the editor of Journal of Librarianship and Information Science and on the editorial board of SAGE Open.

Selected works
 Profiling and records of achievement in higher education, 1994
 Developing the flexible library and information workforce : a quality and equal opportunities perspective, 1996
 Training for part-time and temporary workers, 1997
 Likely to succeed: attitudes and aptitudes for an effective information profession in the 21st century, 1999
 Investing in LIS people : the impact of the Investors in People initiative on the library and information sector, 1999
 Women and the Information Society Barriers and Participation, 2002
 Defining services and debating the future, 2008
 Public Libraries in the 21st Century: Defining Services and Debating the Future. Ashgate Publishing, 2012.

References

External links
 google scholar
 linked-in
 institutional homepage

New Zealand women academics
English emigrants to New Zealand
Academic staff of the Victoria University of Wellington
Alumni of the University of Sheffield
1966 births
Living people
Place of birth missing (living people)
New Zealand women writers